"It's Christmas Day" is a Christmas song by South Korean singer-songwriter Roy Kim. It was released as a digital single on 19 December 2014, and distributed through CJ E&M Music.

Release
"It's Christmas Day" was composed and written by Kim. After taking over spring with "Bom Bom Bom", summer with "Love Love Love", and autumn with "Home", Kim filled all of four seasons with his winter song release. On 11 December 2014, Kim posted up on his official Instagram account, stating "It's gonna be Christmas Day soon. Wait for it. Recording a new song."

The self-penned single was released on 19 December, one day ahead of his year-end concert, "Our Winter #2". Its music video also was revealed at the same day, bringing all kinds of Christmas feels with Kim sweetly singing while playing the piano and guitar. "It's Christmas Day" peaked at number 27 on the Gaon Digital Chart, having sold over 69,000 digital copies as of 3 January 2015.

Promotion
Following its release, Kim performed the song at Mnet's M! Countdown broadcast on Christmas Day of that year.

Track listing

Credits and personnel
Credits are adapted from the liner notes of the single's limited CD edition.

Locations

 Recorded at Brewbeat Studio 
 Recorded at Studio 40 
 Recorded at Musicabal 
 Recorded at T Studio 
 Mixed at Musicabal
 Mastered at Metropolis Mastering, London

Personnel

 Sang-woo Kim – vocals, lyrics, composer, percussion, backing vocals
 Ji-chan Jung – arranger, acoustic guitar, keyboard, programming, percussion, music producer
 Steve Brewster – drum
 Ken Song – electric guitar
 Hoon Choi – bass
 In-young Bak – arranging of strings
 Yoong String – strings
 Seong-sik Oh – recording of strings
 Kyung-hoon Baek – recording assistant
 Hyun-jung Go – mixing
 Stuart Hawkes – mastering
 Seok-jun Ahn – executive producer

Charts and sales

Weekly charts

Monthly charts

Sales

Release history

References

External links
 
 Roy Kim's official website  

2014 singles
2014 songs
Korean-language songs
South Korean songs